Pescadero is the Spanish word for 'fishmonger'.

Pescadero may also refer to:

Places
 Pescadero, California, USA, a town in San Mateo County, California
 Pescadero State Beach
 El Pescadero, Baja California Sur, Mexico, a coastal town north of Cabo San Lucas
 Punta Pescadero, Baja California Sur, Mexico, a point of land served by the Punta Pescadero Airstrip
 "Pescadero" (see History of Mozilla Firefox), codename for version 0.1 of Mozilla Firefox

Streams
 Pescadero Creek, a stream in San Mateo County, California
 Pescadero Creek (Pajaro River), a stream in Santa Clara and Santa Cruz Counties, tributary to the Pajaro River in California